Helfried Jurtschitsch (born 17 July 1971) is an Austrian rower. He competed in the men's lightweight coxless four event at the 2000 Summer Olympics.

References

1971 births
Living people
Austrian male rowers
Olympic rowers of Austria
Rowers at the 2000 Summer Olympics
People from Sankt Pölten
Sportspeople from Lower Austria